Antonietta may refer to:

Antonietta (given name), a female given name
Antonietta (gastropod), a genus belonging to the taxonomic family Glaucidae of colorful sea slugs
Antonietta (novel), a 1991 novel by John Hersey

See also
Antonieta, a 1982 Spanish film
Antonia (disambiguation)
Antonina (disambiguation)